Paul Johnson is a book artist and teacher in the United Kingdom. He is best known as a pop-up and movable book artist and for his work as a teacher of book art and children’s literacy. Johnson, the founder of the Book Art Project, an initiative that teaches writing to children through book making, has made books with over 200,000 children and over 25,000 teachers worldwide.

Early life and education
Johnson grew up in Norwich, England. He attended the Norwich University of the Arts and Rabindranath Tagore’s University of Santiniketan in India before getting his PhD from York University.  After experimenting with poetry and performance art, Johnson began to make his own books in his early 40s.

As Educator
In 1987, while an art educator at the Manchester Metropolitan University, Johnson launched the Book Art Project, designed to advance writing and communication skills through courses, publications and workshops for teachers and children.

Johnson is the author of almost 20 publications about book making, including the seminal 1992 Pop-up Paper Engineering guide to the moveable book form. Other books by Johnson include:

 A Book of One's Own: Developing Literacy Through Making Books (1991)
 Books Searching for Authors (1994)
 Get Writing! Ages 4 - 7: Creative Book-Making Projects for Children (2005)
 Get Writing! Ages 7-12: Creative Book-Making Projects for Children (2008)
 Literacy Through the Book Arts (1993)
 Making Books: Over 30 Practical Book-Making Projects for Children (2000)
 Making Your Own Book (1994)
 New Pop-Up Paper Projects: Step-by-step paper engineering for all ages (2013) 
 Pictures & Words Together: Children Illustrating and Writing Their Own Books (1997) 
 Pop-up Paper Engineering: Cross-curricular Activities in Design Engineering Technology, English and Art (1992)

As Book Artist

Early in his artistic career, Johnson was inspired to consider a book as more than something to read after seeing the sculptural book bindings of Phillip Smith, MBE. Johnson's own style embraces a profusion of bright-colored fabric dyes onto watercolor paper, many times on both the front and back of the paper. Johnson's book art creations are unique in that he does not use glue in his books. He constructs the pop-up mechanisms using dovetail, joints and paper hinges. A single book structure could include up to 200 individual pieces.

In 2018, the Johns Hopkins University acquired the Paul Johnson Archive comprising over five hundred items of his artwork (including 250 pop-ups) dating from approximately 1965-2015.

Johnson was awarded the 2021 Meggendorfer Prize for Best Artist Book from the Movable Book Society for "The Lemon Tree". The prize recognizes outstanding three-dimensional books not commercially published or mass produced.

External links

References 

Living people
1943 births
English artists
Pop-up book artists
Alumni of Norwich University of the Arts